KZDY 96.3 FM is a radio station licensed to Cawker City, Kansas.  The station broadcasts an adult contemporary format and is owned by Dierking Communications, Inc.

References

External links
KZDY's official website

ZDY
Mainstream adult contemporary radio stations in the United States